The 2014 Northern Cape provincial election was held on 7 May 2014 to elect all 30 members of the Northern Cape Provincial Legislature. As with all South African provincial elections, it was held concurrent with the 2014 South African general election. The ruling ANC gained a seat, and the opposition Democratic Alliance gained three seats. The Economic Freedom Fighters, founded less than a year earlier, won two seats.

Results

References

Further reading 

2014 elections in South Africa